Mikhail Alekseyevich Belyaev (December 23, 18631918) was a Russian general of the Infantry, statesman, Chief of Staff of the Imperial Russian Army from August 1, 1914, to August 10, 1916, and was the last Minister of War of the Russian Empire from January 3, 1917, to February 28, 1917.

Family

The noble family of Belyaev had a rich military history, the family had given many soldiers. Including Mikhail's cousin, the hero of the Chaco War, General Ivan Timofeevich Belyaev. Nikolai Timofeevich Belyaev, a participant in World War 1 and a scientist-metallurgist. And also Mikhail Nikolayevich Belyaev, a participant in the Russo-Japanese War. One of his second cousin was the wife of Alexander Lvovich Blok, who was accordingly, was the father of the famous poet Alexander Alexandrovich Blok.

Early life

Early life and military career
Mikhail was born in Saint Petersburg on December 23, 1863, to Lieutenant-General Aleksei Mikhailovich Belyaev. At an early age, he attended The Third Saint Petersburg Gymnasium. In 1885, he graduated from the Mikhailovsky Artillery School, after which he served in several military units and the Imperial Guards. He was promoted to lieutenant at mid August 1890. In 1893, after he graduated from the Nikolayev Academy of General Staff, he continued to serve in the Imperial Guards. In late November 1893, he was appointed the senior adjutant of the 24th Infantry Division of the 1st Army Corps. In mid January 1897, he was appointed Chief Officer for special assignments of the 18th Army Corps and chief of staff of the army corps in early December. He rose to lieutenant-colonel in early April 1898. From early December 1898, he served in the Military-Scientific Committee of the General Staff as a junior clerk, he rose to senior clerk in mid April 1901. He was also promoted to colonel in the same month. In mid May 1902, he again served in the Imperial Guards, this time he command a battalion in the Izmaylovsky Lifeguard Regiment.

Russo-Japanese War
In 1904, Belyaev participated in the Russo-Japanese War. From mid February 1904, he was an officer in the headquarters for special assignments under head of the headquarters of the Viceroy of the Russian Far East, General Yakov Zhilinsky. In late November 1904, he became the Chief of the Chancery of the Field Staff of the 1st Manchurian Army. From mid August 1905 till the end of the war, he was the Chancery of the new commander-in-chief, the aged general Nikolai Linevich. For military distinctions, Belyaev was awarded the Gold Sword for Bravery.

After the war, he was promoted to major-general in mid April 1908. In mid March 1909, he became a member of the Main Serfdom Committee of the country. By the end of 1910, he became the head of the Division for the Establishment and Service of the Troops of the State Security Service. He was promoted to lieutenant-general in mid June 1912.

World War 1

After the mobilisation of the Army, General Belyaev was promoted to General of the Infantry in early December, he was also appointed the Chief of Staff of the army in early August of that year. In late June 1915, he became an assistant to the Ministers of War, General Alexei Polivanov, he later became General Polivanov's chief of staff. But later in early August 1916, he was relieved from his post and became a member in the Military Council and a representative of the Russian command at the Romanian Main Apartment. And in early 1917, he replaced General Dmitry Shuvayev as Minister of War, becoming the last in the Russian Empire.

February Revolution
On February 23 (Julian calendar, the date in the Gregorian calendar was March 8) 1917, the February Revolution broke out. General Belyaev together with the district commander General Sergey Khabalov, declared that Petrograd to be in a stage of siege, he and General Khabalov attempted to suppress the Revolution, and he had asked to arrange the sending of correct units from the front. But at last, he and General Khabalov failed to suppress the revolution because of mutinies in the army and the soldier refused to take orders. There were even some revolutionary soldiers in the army, shooting loyal soldiers and police.

After this failure, General Belyaev was arrested and was put in custodies in the Peter and Paul Fortress. He was soon released, but was rearrested in July, in the order by the Provisional Government. After his rearrest, he was questioned by the Extraordinary Investigative Commission of the Provisional Government, but they failed to accuse the general of abuse. He was released shortly after the October Revolution. After that he didn't participated in any public event, but in 1918, he was arrested by the Cheka and was subsequently shot.

Honours and awards

Russian Empire
 Order of St. Stanislaus, 3rd class (1895)
 Order of St. Anna, 3rd class (1899)
 Order of St. Anna, 2nd class with swords (1904)
 Order of St. Vladimir, 4th class with swords and a bow (1905)
 Gold Sword for Bravery (1907)
 Order of St. Vladimir, 3rd class (1907)
 Order of St. Stanislaus, 1st class (18.4.1910)
 Order of St. Anna, 1st class (6.12.1913)
 Order of St. Vladimir, 2nd class (1915)

Foreign
:
 Order of the Lion and the Sun

References

1863 births
1918 deaths
20th-century executions by Russia
Military personnel from Saint Petersburg
Imperial Russian Army generals
Russian nobility